Bhindawas Wildlife Sanctuary Ramsar site is located in Jhajjar district, which is about 15 km from Jhajjar in Haryana. On 3 June 2009, it is also declared as bird sanctuary by the Indian Government. 

This is an important part of ecological corridor along the route of Sahibi River which traverses from Aravalli hills in Rajasthan to Yamuna via Masani barrage, Matanhail forest, Chhuchhakwas-Godhari, Khaparwas Wildlife Sanctuary, Bhindawas Wildlife Sanctuary, Outfall Drain Number 6 (canalised portion in Haryana of Sahibii river), Outfall Drain Number 8 (canalised portion in Haryana of Dohan river which is a tributary of Sahibi river), Sarbashirpur, Sultanpur National Park, Basai Wetland and The Lost Lake of Gurugram. It lies 5km northwest of Bhindawas Bird Sancturay and 46 km northwest of Sultanpur National Park via road.

Location
This 411.55 hectares sanctuary is located 15 km from Jhajjar on the Jhajjar-Kasani road and 105 km from Delhi. Bhindawas Wildlife Sanctuary is only 1.5 km from Khaparwas Wildlife Sanctuary and it is located here map. Niwada, Bhindawas, Chandol, Chadhwana, Bilochpura, Reduwas and Kasni are the adjacent village.

History
Forests Department, Haryana of Government of Haryana officially notified this 411.55 hectares area as Wildlife Sanctuary on 5 July 1985.

Bhindawas lake
Rain water, JLN Feeder canal and its escape channel are main source of water in the bird sanctuary.

Nearby Attraction
 Khaparwas Wildlife Sanctuary - 1.5 km from Bhindawas Wildlife Sanctuary.

See also
 List of National Parks & Wildlife Sanctuaries of Haryana, India
 Haryana Tourism
 List of Monuments of National Importance in Haryana
 List of State Protected Monuments in Haryana
 List of Indus Valley Civilization sites in Haryana, Punjab, Rajasthan, Gujarat, India & Pakistan
Sultanpur National Park
Okhla Sanctuary, bordering Delhi in adjoining Uttar Pradesh
Nearby Najafgarh drain bird sanctuary, Delhi
Nearby Najafgarh lake or Najafgarh jheel (Now completely drained by Najafgarh drain)
National Zoological Park Delhi
Asola Bhatti Wildlife Sanctuary, Delhi
Bhalswa horseshoe lake, Delhi
Black francolin, Haryana State Bird (राज्य पक्षी हरियाणा-काला तीतर)

References 

Villages in Jhajjar district
Lakes of Haryana
Wildlife sanctuaries in Haryana
Protected areas of Haryana
National parks in Haryana
Wetlands of India
Bird sanctuaries of India
2009 establishments in Haryana
Protected areas established in 2009
Ramsar sites in India